Achterberg is a surname. Notable people with the surname include:

Chantal Achterberg (born 1985), Dutch rower
Eberhard Achterberg (1910–1983), German religious scholar
Eddy Achterberg (born 1947), Dutch footballer and coach
Fritz Achterberg (1880–1971), German actor
Gerd Achterberg (born 1940), German football manager
Gerrit Achterberg (1905–1962), Dutch poet
Giorgio Achterberg (born 1990), Dutch footballer
Jeanne Achterberg (1942–2012), American psychologist 
John Achterberg (born 1971), Dutch footballer

See also 
 Agterberg